"Wobble Wobble" is the debut single by 504 Boyz, released in 2000 from their debut studio album, Goodfellas. The song was produced by Beats by the Pound member Carlos Stephens and featured seven members of the group, Master P, C-Murder, Silkk the Shocker, Mac, Magic, Krazy and Mystikal. The production incorporates elements of the New Orleans hip-hop subgenre of bounce music. The Goodfellas version is a remix, since the original appeared on Magic's album Thuggin' first. The original version, also produced by Carlos Stephens, features a slightly different beat and only features Magic, C-Murder, and Mac.

The song became one of No Limit's biggest hits, peaking at number 17 on the Billboard Hot 100 and topping the Hot Rap Singles chart. It was the third biggest rap single of 2000, held from the top spot by Missy Elliott's "Hot Boyz" and Solé's "4, 5, 6".

Single track listing
"Wobble Wobble" (Album version)
"Wobble Wobble" (Radio version)
"Don't Play No Games" (performed by Krazy)
"Wobble Wobble" (Instrumental)

Charts

Peak positions

Year-end charts

References

2000 songs
2000 debut singles
American hip hop songs
No Limit Records singles
Priority Records singles